Circus of Life (German: Zirkus des Lebens) is a 1921 German silent drama film directed by Johannes Guter and starring Werner Krauss, Lydia Potechina and Rudolf Klein-Rogge.

The film's sets were designed by the art director Hermann Warm. It premiered at the Marmorhaus in Berlin.

Cast
 Werner Krauss as Philipp Hogger 
 Lydia Potechina as Stepanida 
 Rudolf Klein-Rogge as Chauffeur Tom 
 Emil Heyse as Clown Apapit
 Joseph Klein as George Garpin
 Philipp Manning as Alter Diener 
 J.N. Douvan-Tarzow as Senator Hartwich
 Gustav May as Henry Hogger
 Paul Richter as Francesco 
 Greta Schröder as Alegria 
 Vicky Werckmeister as Elinor Hartwich

References

Bibliography
 Hardt, Ursula. From Caligari to California: Erich Pommer's life in the International Film Wars. Berghahn Books, 1996.

External links

1921 films
Films of the Weimar Republic
German silent feature films
Films directed by Johannes Guter
German black-and-white films
Circus films
UFA GmbH films